Degia imparata is a moth in the Psychidae family. It is found in China (Yunnan), Vietnam, Thailand, Malaysia, Borneo, the Philippines and Sumatra.

References

Natural History Museum Lepidoptera generic names catalog

Psychidae
Taxa named by Francis Walker (entomologist)
Moths described in 1862